Global Flatline is the seventh album by death metal band Aborted.  It was released on January 20, 2012, in Europe, through Century Media Records. The album was recorded at Hansen Studios in Denmark with producer Jacob Hansen, and is the first to feature ex-Abigail Williams members Ken Bedene on drums and Mike Wilson on guitar, as well as bassist J.B. Van Der Wal.

The songs "Coronary Reconstruction", "From a Tepid Whiff" and "Grime" all previously appeared on the band's 2010 EP Coronary Reconstruction. The first single, "Global Flatline", was released digitally on October 25, 2011.

Track listing

Personnel

Aborted
Sven "Svencho" de Caluwé – vocals
Eran Segal – guitar
Mike Wilson – guitar
Ken Bedene – drums
J.B. Van Der Wal – bass

Guest musicians
Jason Netherton (Misery Index) – vocals (track 12)
Keijo Niinimaa (Rotten Sound) – vocals (track 11)
Trevor Strnad (The Black Dahlia Murder) – vocals (track 7)
Julien Truchan (Benighted) – vocals (tracks 3 and 14)

Production
Jacob Hansen – producer, engineer, mixing, mastering
Alex Karlinsky – sound design
Justin Osbourn – artwork

References 

2012 albums
Aborted (band) albums
Century Media Records albums
Albums produced by Jacob Hansen